Compagnia Generale del Disco (CGD) was an Italian record label.

History
CGD was founded in 1948 by singer Teddy Reno. At that time it was established in Milan in Via Passarella 4. As artistic director Reno called fellow musician Lelio Luttazzi, who replaced David Matalon as Head of International Production in 1956.

By collaborating with some publishers such as Suvini-Zerboni and Messaggerie Musicali, CGD was able to hire many artists who roused much success as Giorgio Consolini, Betty Curtis and Johnny Dorelli.

Under the Sugar Helm
In 1959, Teddy Reno sold CGD to Ladislao Sugar, a publisher of Hungarian origin and future entrepreneurial owner of the Sugar Group, which was founded by Carlo Alberto Rossi's Casa Editrice Ariston, and then abandoned to buy Musical Messengers (Messaggerie Musicali). It was on this occasion that he came into contact with Teddy Reno.

In 1961, CGD moved to Galleria del Corso, where many other record labels and music publishing were located. In 1968, Ladislas decided to focus on the publishing division Grove Press and was replaced by his son, Peter.

Merger with CBS Italia
In 1966, CGD made an agreement with CBS to distribute its catalog in Italy. In 1970, CGD eventually merged with CBS Italia and established CBS Sugar.

In 1973, it moved to Via Quintiliano 40. In 1977, when CBS decided to open its own premises in Italy, all the Italian artists who recorded for CBS were incorporated with CGD and their records were reissued by the new record label.

In the same year, Peter Sugar's wife, pop star Caterina Caselli decided to establish a satellite record company, supporting non-mainstream acts like The Radio Dept, Franco Fanigliulo, Piccola Orchestra Avion Travel and Elisa.

Later years
Throughout the 1980s, CGD continued its operations with 9 subsidiary labels. A notable signee during this decade was the late American singer Nicolette Larson, who recorded only one album for the company, Shadows of Love.

In 1988, CGD, like many other record companies, ran out of business. East West Records, under Warner Music Group, bought the label & continued its operations. In 1995, it changed its name to CGD East West. In early 2000s, the former was merged to Atlantic Records.

Notes
CGD at the Discogs

Defunct record labels of Italy
Record labels established in 1948
Record labels disestablished in 1989
Pop record labels